Anoop Suri is a hotelier from India. He was born on 18 March 1971 in an industrial colony of Bharat Heavy Electrical Limited (BHEL) in the city of Haridwar. He is from a middle class family. His father Amrit Lal Suri  worked at BHEL and his mother Prem Suri was a homemaker. He was married to Niketa on 25 May 1998, and had two children who were called Sidharth Suri (born on 31 July 1999 at New Delhi) and Saloni Suri (born on 24 June 2006, in Margao, Goa).

Education 
He finished his schooling from Kendriya Vidyalaya No. 1 (central school) in Haridwar in 1988 and got his Hotel Management Diploma from the Institute of Hotel Management, Catering Technology and applied Nutrition.

Certifications and fellowships 

 Certified Hotel Administrator (CHA) by American Hotel and Lodging Educational Institute 
 Fellow of Institute of Hospitality (former HCIMA, London) 
 Fellow of Management Studies Promotion Institute
 Fellow of All India Management Council

Professional memberships 
 Founder Member & Treasurer (2007) Skål International, Goa 
 Founder Member of International Hotel General Managers Association.
 Professional Member Luxury Hotel Association.
 Member of the International Food Service Executives Association
 Life Member of the Poetry Society of India
 Life Member of the People for Animals
 Ex-member of the Rotary Club of Nilgiri West
 Honorary Member & Adviser for the Academic Council of All India Institute of Career Studies
 Life Member, Red Cross Society of India

Professional life 
In 1991 he started his professional career as a management trainee in cost controls with Bakers Basket, a unit of Blue Diamond Hotels, Pune. He shifted back to Goa, where he had finished his studies in hotel management. He joined one of the oldest luxury hotels, Fidalgo, as an operations management trainee, and was trained in all departments. He was part of the Executive Management Team as an assistant to the General Manager.

His professional timeline is:

 1992:     F&B Manager, Hotel Reis Magos, Goa, India
 1993:     Manager Operations, Hotel Atish, Goa, India
 1995:     General Manager, Hotel Green Park, Goa, India
 1995:     Resort Manager, Shambhala Mountain Resort, Sikkim, India
 2000:     General Manager, ITC Fortune Park Hotels, Darjeeling and Kolkata , India
 2002:     General Manager, Nirula Hotels, Panipat, India
 2004:     Resort Manager, Sterling Days Inn Resorts (two resorts), Ootacamund, India
 2005:     General Manager, Royal Goan Beach Resorts (Karma group), Goa, India
 2009:     General Manager, Sayaji Hotels, Indore, India
 2010:     General Manager, TGB Hotels, Surat, India

In March 2015 he made a decision to go to the Kurdistan region of north Iraq to work on a project called the Korek Mountain Resort & Spa on Mount Korek. At that time he was interviewed by RudawTV for their show Made in Kurdistan. and Al Zazeera.

In 2016 he was appointed Director of Leminscate Hospitality Initiative Pvt. Ltd. and 2020 became Executive director

Literary work 
He is also a motivational writer and guru. He has written several articles on hotel management and travel related topics that have been published in various magazines and trade newspapers. He also undertakes lectures and presentations.

His study books on hotel management include:
 Front Office Management
 Food & Beverage Service
 Food Production
 Accommodation Operation & Hotel Maintenance
 Engineering for a Private Hotel Management Institute
He is working in close cooperation with Global Hospitality Initiative to produce online courses and has offered the first course "Managing Covid19 in Hotel industry"

Awards 
He has Received various awards personally.

 Rambha Shri Award for Hindi Poetry
 Super Intellectual Award , 1997 from All India Management Council
 Best General Manager 2016 - awarded by Haute Grandeur Global Hotel Awards.
 Excellence in Innovative Leadership 2017- World Leadership Federation.
 Successful Indian GM Overseas - By Golden Globe Tigers 2017
Leadership Excellence in Hotel Industry - By Asia Hotel Awards for excellence Aug 2017

References 

Indian hoteliers
Indian male writers
Kendriya Vidyalaya alumni
1971 births
Living people